The year 1937 in science and technology involved some significant events, listed below.

Astronomy
 June 8 – First total solar eclipse to exceed 7 minutes of totality in over 800 years; visible in the Pacific and Peru.

Biology
 September 27 – Last definite record of a Bali tiger shot.
 Meredith Crawford first publishes results of the cooperative pulling paradigm, with chimpanzees in the United States.
 Jay Laurence Lush publishes the influential textbook Animal Breeding Plans in the United States.
 The citric acid cycle is finally identified by Hans Adolf Krebs.

Chemistry
 Carlo Perrier and Emilio Segrè at the University of Palermo confirm discovery of the chemical element which will become known as Technetium.
 The opioid Methadone is synthesized in Germany by scientists working at Hoechst AG.
 Otto Bayer and his coworkers at IG Farben in Leverkusen, Germany, first make polyurethanes.

Computer science
 January –  Alan Turing's 1936 paper "On Computable Numbers" first appears in print. Alonzo Church's review of it in Journal of Symbolic Logic introduces the term Turing machine.
 Claude Shannon's Master's thesis at MIT demonstrates that electronic application of Boolean algebra could construct and resolve any logical numerical relationship.
 Konrad Zuse submits patents in Germany based on his Z1 computer design anticipating von Neumann architecture.

Exploration
 British Graham Land Expedition (1934–1937) concludes its work, having determined that Graham Land is an integral part of the Antarctic Peninsula and not an independent archipelago.

Mathematics
 Bruno de Finetti publishes "La Prévision: ses lois logiques, ses sources subjectives" in Annales de l'Institut Henri Poincaré, his most influential treatment of his theorem on exchangeable sequences of random variables.
 Hans Freudenthal proves the Freudenthal suspension theorem in homotopy.
 Goldberg polyhedron first described.

Medicine
 November 2 – English clinical pathologist Lionel Whitby discovers sulphapyridine M&B 693, a first-generation sulphonamide antibiotic which in 1938 is first prescribed to treat pneumonia.
 First typhus vaccine by Rudolf Weigl, Ludwik Fleck and Hans Zinsser; influenza vaccine by Anatol Smorodintsev.
 Both respirator designed in Australia.
 Italian psychiatrist Amarro Fiamberti is the first to document a transorbital approach to the brain, which becomes the basis for the controversial medical procedure of transorbital lobotomy.
 Publication in the United Kingdom of Dr A. J. Cronin's novel The Citadel, promoting the cause of socialised medicine.

Physics
 January – Albert Einstein and Nathan Rosen publish a paper denying that gravitational waves can exist.
 Eugene Wigner introduces the term isospin.

Technology
 April 12 – Frank Whittle ground-tests the first jet engine designed to power an aircraft, at Rugby, England.
 May 28 – Rocker Shovel Loader patent applied for in the United States.
 June 5 – Alan Blumlein is granted a patent for an ultra-linear amplifier.
 Alec Reeves invents pulse-code modulation.

Awards
 Nobel Prizes
 Physics – Clinton Joseph Davisson, George Paget Thomson
 Chemistry – Walter Haworth, Paul Karrer
 Medicine – Albert von Szent-Györgyi Nagyrapolt
 Copley Medal – Henry Dale
 Wollaston Medal for geology – Waldemar Lindgren

Births
 January 14 – Leo Kadanoff, American physicist (died 2015)
 February 18 – Chen Chuangtian (died 2018), Chinese materials scientist.
 March 16 – Amos Tversky (died 1996), Jewish American cognitive and mathematical psychologist, recipient of the Nobel Memorial Prize in Economic Sciences.
 April 17 – Don Buchla (died 2016), American electronic engineer, pioneer of sound synthesizers.
 May 9 – Alison Jolly (died 2014), American primatologist.
 May 13 – Trevor Baylis (died 2018), English inventor.
 June 8 – Bruce McCandless II (died 2017), American astronaut.
 June 9  – Harald Rosenthal, German biologist
 June 11 – David Mumford, American mathematician.
 June 21 – Averil Mansfield, English vascular surgeon.
 June 23 – Nicholas Shackleton (died 2006), English Quaternary geologist and paleoclimatologist, recipient of the Vetlesen Prize.
 June 26 – Robert Coleman Richardson (died 2013), American experimental physicist, recipient of the Nobel Prize in Physics.
 July 1 – Lydia Makhubu, Swazi chemist.
 July 19 – Bibb Latané, American social psychologist.
 July 26 – Ernest Vinberg (died 2020), Russian mathematician.
 August 2 – Coenraad Bron, Dutch computer scientist (d. 2006)
 September 8 – Edna Adan Ismail, Somali pioneer of pediatrics.
 December 26 – John Horton Conway, English-born mathematician (d. 2020)

Deaths
 January 28 – Arthur Pollen (born 1866), English inventor.
 January 29 – Aleen Cust (born 1868), Irish veterinary surgeon.
 February 5 – Lou Andreas-Salomé (born 1861), German psychoanalyst.
 May 28 – Alfred Adler (born 1870), Austrian psychotherapist.
 June 11 – R. J. Mitchell (born 1895), English aeronautical engineer.
 July 20 – Guglielmo Marconi (born 1874), Italian inventor.
 July 30 – Victor Despeignes (born 1866), French pioneer of radiation oncology.
 October 16 – William Sealy Gosset (born 1876), English statistician.
 October 19 – Ernest Rutherford (born 1871), New Zealand-born British physicist and laureate of the Nobel Prize in Physics.
 November 23 – Jagadish Chandra Bose (born 1858), Bengali physicist.

References

 
20th century in science
1930s in science